Faye Ginsburg (born October 28, 1952) is an American anthropologist who has devoted her life to the exploration of different cultures and individuals’ styles of life. Ginsburg has published ethnographies about her fieldwork experiences in the U.S., Canada and Australia.  The intercultural connections in her ethnographies have contributed to the fields of anthropology and sociology because they allow readers to understand other cultures through her narratives. Currently, she is an anthropology professor at New York University  and the director of the Center for Media, Culture and History at NYU.

Early life and education 
She was born on October 28, 1952 in Chicago, Illinois.

She graduated from Barnard College in 1976 with a BA, and from City University of New York, with a Ph.D. in 1986.

Publications 
Faye D. Ginsburg is the editor of Contested Lives: The Abortion Debate in an American Community. In this book the author talks about the Fargo Women's Health Organization. The Fargo Women's Health Organization was the first facility to offer abortions publicly in North Dakota. Ginsburg discusses the pro-choice and pro-life movement's evolution in North Dakota and furthermore, the United States.

Ginsburg also published Media Worlds: Anthropology on New Terrain  with Lila Abu-Lughod and Brian Larkin. The twenty chapters in Media Worlds "treat materials from local and disaporic communities worldwide  and discusses sites of production and consumption. The chapters in the book talk about different technologies utilized by other cultures. Ginsburg focuses on aborigines in Australia and the individuals residing in the Baffin Islands, Canada.

Other publications 
 Uncertain Terms: Negotiating Gender in American Culture.
 9/11 and After, A Virtual Case Book.
 Conceiving the New World Order: The Global Politics of Reproduction.

Publications in progress 
 Mediating Culture: Indigenous Identity in a Digital Age.
 Disability, Personhood, and the New Normal in 21st Century America

Awards
 1994 MacArthur Fellows Program
 2004 Council on Anthropology and Reproduction Edited Volume Prize,
 American Sociological Association's Sociology of Culture Book Award.
 Society for Medical Anthropology's Basket Award for Research on Gender and Health.

References

External links
"Faye Ginsburg archive" at Flow TV

1952 births
Living people
American anthropologists
American women anthropologists
New York University faculty
Barnard College alumni
Graduate Center, CUNY alumni
MacArthur Fellows
Jewish anthropologists
American women academics
21st-century American women